Same-sex marriage is currently not recognised in the Cayman Islands. The island's statutory law limits marriage to different-sex couples. A lawsuit with the Grand Court successfully challenged this ban in March 2019; however, the Court of Appeal overturned the ruling in November 2019. Same-sex civil partnerships are legal following the enactment of the Civil Partnership Law, 2020 on 4 September 2020. 

Same-sex marriages legally performed in other jurisdictions are recognised as civil partnerships in the Cayman Islands.

Background

In 2006, the Cayman "People for Referendum" activist group began protesting against LGBT rights and same-sex marriage, after a Netherlands Antilles court ruled that Aruba had to recognise same-sex marriages registered in the Netherlands. The group criticised the judgement, claiming that the British Foreign and Commonwealth Office (FCO) could force legal recognition of same-sex marriages in the Cayman Islands.

The Constitution of the Cayman Islands, approved in June 2009, notes that the Government of the Cayman Islands "shall respect" the right of every unmarried man and woman of marriageable age as defined by law to freely marry a person of the opposite sex and to found a family. The Constitution does not, however, explicitly define the term "marriage" nor does it explicitly prohibit same-sex marriage. In August 2015, following the ruling in Oliari and Others v Italy, a case in which the European Court of Human Rights (ECHR) ruled that it is discriminatory to provide no legal recognition to same-sex couples, the Legislative Assembly unanimously (except for four abstentions) passed a motion reaffirming the same-sex marriage ban. The ECHR has jurisprudence over the Cayman Islands.

In 2015, Premier Alden McLaughlin indicated that the government was examining immigration law and regulations to allow same-sex couples who have legally married in other jurisdictions the right to have their spouse recognised as a dependant. In July 2016, the Immigration Appeals Tribunal ruled in favour of a gay man who sought to be recognised as a dependant. The couple's application had been made 14 months prior and had  been rejected by immigration authorities. A July 2016 ruling by the European Court of Human Rights had significant implications for the lawsuit. The ECHR found that refusal to grant a residence permit to a same-sex couple in Italy on family grounds was unjustified discrimination. Despite this ruling, immigration authorities later refused to grant dependency rights to two dual Caymanian-British same-sex couples. The two couples were forced to leave the Cayman Islands, despite one partner being a Cayman citizen.

On 6 October 2016, the Legislative Assembly voted against holding a referendum on the legalisation of same-sex marriage. The proposal was voted down 8–9. It was filed by MLA Anthony Eden after the Immigration Appeals Tribunal ruled to allow the same-sex partner of a work permit holder to remain in the Cayman Islands as a dependant on his or her partner's permit. Premier Alden McLaughlin expressed his opposition to the referendum proposal. In the weeks prior to the 2017 elections, legal expert Dr Leo Raznovich invited same-sex couples on the island to challenge the implicit ban on same-sex marriage in Cayman law, arguing the lack of express prohibition in the Constitution and local legislation to same-sex marriage triggers sections 24 and 25 of the Constitution.

Lawsuit and civil partnerships

In April 2018, a dual Caymanian-British same-sex couple, Chantelle Day and Vickie Bodden, revealed their intention to file a lawsuit challenging the Cayman Islands' statutory same-sex marriage ban, after their application to marry was rejected by the civil registry. The couple formally filed suit with the Grand Court on 20 June 2018, arguing that the section of the Marriage Law which defines marriage as between "one man and one woman" was incompatible with various rights guaranteed under the Constitution.

Oral arguments in the case were heard by the court, specifically Chief Justice Anthony Smellie, in February 2019. During the arguments, government lawyers admitted that there was a persuasive case under the Constitution for same-sex couples to have a right to a civil union or domestic partnership scheme, though they argued that the creation of such a scheme should be left to legislators. On 29 March 2019, the court handed down its ruling in favour of the plaintiffs, finding that the ban on same-sex marriage was a clear violation of freedoms guaranteed in the Cayman Constitution, including the right to a private and family life. Justice Smellie used his judicial powers to rewrite the marriage law, ordering that the clause specifying marriage be reserved for heterosexual couples be altered to state, "'Marriage' means the union between two people as one another's spouses."

The ruling went into effect immediately and did not require ratification by the Legislative Assembly or the governor. On 3 April 2019, Premier Alden McLaughlin announced that the government would appeal the decision and seek a stay of the judgement. The ruling was met with fierce opposition by the Assembly, which unanimously passed a motion expressing disagreement with the ruling and commending the decision to appeal. Several Assembly members vociferously objected to the ruling, with Representative Anthony Eden decrying "what is the difference between the Cayman Islands and Sodom and Gomorrah?", and Education Minister Julianna O'Connor-Connolly inviting members of the public to violently object to and disrupt the petitioners' marriage, saying "attend the marriage...[and] make sure you object" in person. The Court of Appeal granted the request to stay the ruling on 10 April 2019, thereby preventing the judgement from taking effect. The court heard the case on 28-30 August 2019, and on 7 November 2019 it overturned the Chief Justice's previous judgment. The court called on the Legislative Assembly to enact civil partnerships or a legal equivalent, as required by the European Court of Human Rights' decision in Oliari and Others v Italy and the Bill of Rights of the Constitution, and called on the United Kingdom to step in if the Cayman Government failed to do so. In January 2020, lawyers for the petitioning couple announced they had begun the process of filing an appeal with the UK-based Privy Council.

A domestic partnership bill was introduced to the Legislative Assembly on 26 June 2020. The legislation would allow same-sex and opposite-sex couples to register a domestic partnership, and enjoy several of the rights and benefits of marriage. Governor Martyn Roper called it "a welcome step on the path to ensuring that the rights of everyone in the territory are upheld and that Cayman law is compliant with the recent ruling of the Cayman Islands Court of Appeal". The bill was rejected by a 8–9 vote on 29 July. MLA Kenneth Bryan who had previously expressed support for the bill eventually voted against it, causing it to fail. Premier McLaughlin repeatedly indicated during the bill's debate that failure to pass it would likely result in the Government of the United Kingdom stepping in and imposing domestic partnerships or same-sex marriage on the Cayman Islands.

Reacting to the partnership bill's defeat, the Cayman News Service newspaper wrote that "it is extremely likely that Governor Martyn Roper or the Foreign and Commonwealth Office will intervene directly and either impose this legislation or even re-impose the chief justice's original ruling legalising same-sex marriage." On 30 July, Shadow Minister for Foreign and Commonwealth Affairs Stephen Doughty wrote to UK Overseas Territories Minister Baroness Sugg urging Her Majesty's Government to step in. On 5 August, Baroness Sugg approved the use of the Governor's reserved powers under section 81 of the Constitution of the Cayman Islands to enact a law recognising same-sex civil partnerships. On 10 August, Governor Martyn Roper published a new version of the domestic partnership bill, along with consequential amendments to eleven other laws, that he would enact into law following a 21-day public consultation period. Following the consultation, the title was changed from "domestic partnership" to "civil partnership".

On 4 September 2020, Governor Roper assented to the Civil Partnership Law, 2020 and 11 consequential pieces of legislation which came into effect on the same day. Under the changes, civil partners are allowed to jointly adopt, share health insurance, immigrate together and enjoy other rights extended to married couples. Civil partnerships are open to both same-sex and opposite-sex couples. Premier McLaughlin said he felt "utterly humiliated" that because of the Assembly's failure to pass the bill, as required by the Court of Appeal, the UK Government had been forced to intervene. On 29 October 2020, Samantha Louise Erksine and Alice Hillman Lopez became the first couple in the Cayman Islands to enter a civil partnership.

In December 2020, the marriage of Paul Pearson and Randall Pinder, who were married in Ireland, was recognised by the Immigration Appeals Tribunal as equivalent to a civil partnership. The tribunal ruled that the Cayman Islands is required to recognise same-sex marriages legally performed in other jurisdictions. It also ordered that Pinder be granted permanent residency. The ruling stated that:

Following passage, a conservative Christian group filed a lawsuit against the civil partnership law, arguing that Governor Roper was not permitted to use his constitutional powers to implement the law. On 28 March 2022, Grand Court Judge Richard Williams ruled that Roper did not act unlawfully and his actions were within his scope of responsibility considering the government's breach of the European Convention on Human Rights; "By this mechanism, the Constitution strikes a constitutional balance. In the circumstances where the Court of Appeal has so forcefully set out its expectations, it is understandable and reasonable for the Governor to have felt it necessary to enact the CPA [Civil Partnership Act] due to the long ongoing breach of the international obligation of the UK which otherwise would not have been adequately addressed by Parliament".

Appeal to the Privy Council
In January 2020, lawyers for Chantelle Day and Vickie Bodden announced they had begun the process of appealing the Court of Appeal's ruling to the Privy Council. The Privy Council, with five members, Lord Reed, Lord Hodge, Lady Arden, Lord Sales and Dame Victoria Sharp, heard oral arguments in the case on 23 and 24 February 2021. On 14 March 2022, the Privy Council dismissed the appeal and ruled that the Constitution does not demand the recognition of same-sex marriage. Activists expressed disappointment with the decision. The president of Colours Cayman, Billie Bryan, said, "The Privy Council has done nothing more, by its decision, than reassert the oppressive political environment of yesteryear."

Governor Roper said in a statement, "I must pay tribute to Chantelle and Vickie for their courage and determination in standing up for their rights over the last five years. They have inspired many through their actions. Same-sex marriage is legal throughout the United Kingdom and in several UK Overseas Territories. Going forward, it is a policy matter for the elected government as to whether it now wishes to introduce same-sex marriage in Cayman. That would provide equality between heterosexual and same-sex couples." Premier Wayne Panton said the ruling does not prevent the government from legalising same-sex marriage in the future, "Many of the younger generations of Caymanians have different views on the issue of marriage and this may become an issue of social justice in time to come." Panton also called for tolerance, "The issue of same-sex marriage is an emotive one in our Islands, with strong views held by those in support of and those against same-sex marriages. As we process the Privy Council's ruling, we must remember to conduct ourselves with respect and civility… No matter your view on the issue of same-sex marriage, I ask that you discuss your views respectfully and with due consideration to the feelings and emotions of others."

Statistics
26 couples registered a civil partnership in the Cayman Islands in the first six months. By the end of 2021, 47 couples had entered into a civil partnership.

See also
 LGBT rights in the Cayman Islands
 Recognition of same-sex unions in the Americas
 Same-sex marriage in the United Kingdom
 Recognition of same-sex unions in the British Overseas Territories
 Same-sex union court cases

References

External links
 
 
 
 
 
 
 
 
 
 
 
 

LGBT rights in the Cayman Islands
Cayman Islands
Cayman Islands